JKT48 has released a total of 23 singles, four studio albums, seven stage albums, one live album, one mini album, three collaboration songs, and performed a number of unreleased songs.

Studio albums

Greatest hits albums

Mini albums

Live albums

Stage albums

Singles

Senbatsu history

Promotional singles 
Prior to debut, JKT48 released the following sample CD's under Hits Records on 23 December 2012. Those are covers of AKB48 songs.

 Heavy Rotation: Sample CD Type 01 of 04
 Karena Kusuka Dirimu: Sample CD Type 02 of 04
 Baby! Baby! Baby!: Sample CD Type 03 of 04
 Ponytail dan Shu-shu: Sample CD Type 04 of 04

Stage performances

Pajama Drive
Pajama Drive is a theater stage that was initially performed by the first generation on 17–20 May 2012 in the Nyi Ageng Serang Building in Kuningan, Jakarta. They followed with performances at Studio 7 Pasaraya Grande Blok M in Jakarta on 14–17 June and on 13–15 July. After their theater's development at fX Sudirman finished, they performed Pajama Drive there from 8 September–13 December 2012. The second generation trainees later performed Pajama Drive from 11 January to 12 May 2013. The third generation trainees performed Pajama Drive at the theater from 24 May 2014 to 17 January 2015, and followed by the members promoted to the newly formed Team T as a waiting stage from 28 January to 6 March 2015. The stage was later performed by Team KIII as a waiting stage, alternately with the revived "Matahari Milikku" between 31 March and 28 July 2015. A combined team of fourth and fifth generation trainees performed the set list between 7 August and 19 November 2016. The stage would later be used for the newly introduced JKT48 academy with members ranging from the fifth and ninth generation. It is currently performed by the tenth generation.

The stage contains sixteen performed songs, preceded by an overture recorded specifically for the group, following its sister groups. A CD and DVD of the stage was released on 13 December 2012.

Set list
 Overture
 Hari Pertama (Shonichi)
 Jurus Rahasia Teleport (Hissatsu Teleport)
 Putri Duyung yang Sedang Sedih (Gokigen Naname na Mermaid)
 Bersepeda Berdua (Futari Nori no Jitensha)
 Ekor Malaikat (Tenshi no Shippo)
 Pajama Drive
 Prinsip Kesucian Hati (Junjou Shugi)
 Air Mata Perasaan yang Tak Tersampaikan (Temodemo no Namida)
 Joan of Arc di Dalam Cermin (Kagami no Naka no Jeanne D'Arc)
 Two Years Later
 Cara Menggunakan Hidup (Inochi no Tsukaimichi)
 Rugi Sudah Dicium (Kiss Shite Son Shichatta)
 Bunga Sakuraku (Boku no Sakura)
Encore
 Wasshoi J!
 Pelaut yang Melihat Mimpi di Tengah Badai (Suifu wa Arashi ni Yume wo Miru)
 Baju Putih (Shiroi Shirts)

Aturan Anti Cinta
Aturan Anti Cinta, also known as Renai Kinshi Jourei and literally translated as "Love Ban Rule", is a theater stage first performed by Team J on 26 December 2012 and ended on 28 December 2013. Team T later performed the stage between 7 December 2016 and 22 May 2017. The stage is currently performed by the new formation of JKT48 since March 2021.

The set list contains sixteen performed songs, preceded by an overture recorded specifically for the group, following its sister groups.

Set list
 Overture
 Cahaya Panjang (Nagai Hikari)
 Di Tengah Hujan Badai Tiba-Tiba (Squall no Aida Ni)
 Gadis SMA Putri Tidur (JK Nemurihime)
 Jatuh Cinta Setiap Bertemu Denganmu (Kimi ni Au Tabi Koi wo Suru)
 Malaikat Hitam (Kuroi Tenshi)
 Virus Tipe Hati (Heart Gata Virus)
 Aturan Anti Cinta (Renai Kinshi Jourei)
 Tsundere!  
 Mawar Natal Musim Panas (Manatsu no Christmas Rose)
 Switch
 109 (Marukyuu)
 Jejak Awan Pesawat (Hikoukigumo)
 Sneakers Waktu Itu (Ano Koro no Sneakers)
Encore
 JKT Datang! (JKT Sanjou!)
 Nafas Dalam Air Mata (Namida no Shinkokyuu)
 Teriakan Berlian (Oogoe Diamond)

Matahari Milikku
Matahari Milikku, also known as Boku no Taiyou and literally translated as "My Sun", is a theater stage performed by the second generation trainees on 17 May to 25 June 2013  and by those trainees who subsequently promoted to Team KIII from 28 June 2013 to 24 February 2014. The stage was then performed by Team J as a surprise stage between 13 February and 13 March 2015. Team KIII performed the stage again as a waiting stage, alternately with the revived "Pajama Drive" from 6 May to 29 July 2015. Team T later performed the stage from 8 July to 9 December 2017.

The set list contains sixteen performed songs, preceded by an overture recorded specifically for the group, following its sister groups.

Set list
 Overture
 Dreamin' Girls
 Run Run Run  
 Buah Masa Depan (Mirai no Kajitsu)
 Viva! Hurricane  
 Jangan Panggil Aku Idol (Idol Nante Yobanaide)
 Aku, Juliet dan Jet Coaster (Boku to Juliet to Jet Coaster)
 Higurashi no Koi  
 Pertahanan dari Cinta (Itoshisa no Defense)
 Bunga Matahari (Himawari)
 Kakak Kelasku (Takeuchi Senpai)
 Dengan Berbagai Alasan (Sonna Konna Wake De)
 Déja vu
 Apakah Kau Melihat Mentari Senja? (Yuuhi wo Miteiru ka?)
Encore
 Lay Down
 Bingo!
 Matahari Milikku (Boku no Taiyou)

Demi Seseorang
Demi Seseorang, also known as Dareka no Tame ni and literally translated as "For Someone", is a theater stage performed by Team J from 18 January 2014 to 26 April 2015. Team T later performed the stage between 10 December 2017 and 18 April 2018.

The set list contains fourteen performed songs, preceded by an overture recorded specifically for the group, following its sister groups.

Set list
 Overture
 Evening Primrose (Tsukimisou)
 Warning
 Malam Ulang Tahun (Tanjoubi no Yoru)
 Bird
 Jatuhkan dengan Kiss Bye! (Nage Kiss de Uchi Otose!)
 Khayalan (Shinkirou)
 Rider
 Seragam ini Sangat Mengganggu (Seifuku ga Jama wo Suru)
 Summer Has Gone (Natsu ga Icchatta)
 Adyth (Koike)
 Bentuk Sang Rembulan (Tsuki no Katachi)
 Demi Seseorang (Dareka no Tame ni ~What can I do for someone?~)
Encore
 "Medley"
 Gadis Penjual Air Mata (Namida Uri no Shoujo)

Gadis-Gadis Remaja
Gadis-Gadis Remaja, also known as Seishun Girls and literally translated as "Youth Girls", is a theater stage performed by Team KIII from 8 March 2014 to 14 Maret 2015. Team T later performed the stage between 20 April and 25 August 2018.

The set list contains fourteen performed songs, preceded by an overture recorded specifically for the group, following its sister groups.

Set list
 Overture
 Gadis-Gadis Remaja (Seishun Girls)
 Beach Sandal
 Sampai Dirimu Menjadi Bintang (Kimi ga Hoshi ni Naru Made)
 Blue Rose
 Dua Orang yang Terlarang (Kinjirareta Futari)
 Kebun Binatang di Saat Hujan (Ame no Doubutsuen)
 Musim Panas yang Kacau (Fushidara na Natsu)
 Don't Disturb!
 Virgin Love
 Garis Pergantian Hari Cinta (Hizuke Henkousen)
 Kembang Api Milikku (Boku no Uchiage Hanabi)
Encore
 Janji ya (Yakusoku yo)
 Jadilah Batu yang Berputar (Korogaru Ishi ni Nare)
 Cinderella Tak Akan Tertipu (Cinderella wa Damasarenai)

Sambil Menggandeng Erat Tanganku
Sambil Menggandeng Erat Tanganku, also known as Te wo Tsunaginagara and literally translated as "While Holding My Hands", is a theater stage performed by Team T from 15 March 2015 to 26 November 2016.

The set list contains sixteen performed songs, preceded by an overture recorded specifically for the group, following its sister groups.

Set list
 Overture
 Angin Kita (Bokura no Kaze)
 Mango No.2
 Sambil Menggandeng Erat Tanganku (Te wo Tsunaginagara)
 Bel Sekolah adalah Love Song (Chime wa Love Song)
 Glory Days
 Barcode Hati Ini (Kono Mune no Barcode)
 Ajak Aku Pergi Menuju ke Wimbledon (Wimbledon e Tsuretette)
 Sang Pianis Hujan (Ame no Pianist)
 Keberadaan Cokelat Itu (Choco no Yukue)
 Innocence
 Romance Rocket
 Arah Sang Cinta dan Balasannya (Koi no Keikou to Taisaku)
 Aku Sangat Suka (Daisuki)
Encore
 Tali Persahabatan (Rope no Yuujou)
 Malam Hari Selasa, Pagi Hari Rabu (Kayoubi no Yoru Suiyobi no Asa)
 Di Tempat yang Jauh pun (Tooku ni Ite mo)

Dewi Theater
Dewi Theater, also known as Theater no Megami and literally translated as "Theater Goddesses", is a theater stageperformed by Team J from 17 May 2015 to 27 November 2016.

The set list contains sixteen performed songs, preceded by an overture recorded specifically for the group, following its sister groups. The stage is opened by a "Zenza Girl" (opener girl) singing "Petak Umpet Romansa" before overture. Zenza Girl differs each shows and is performed by trainees.

Set list
 Overture
 Palu Keberanian (Yuuki No Hammer)
 Persentase Meteor (Inseki Kakuritsu)
 Stripper Cinta (Ai no Stripper)
 Dewi Theater (Theater no Megami)
 Cinta Pertamaku, Selamat Siang (Hatsukoi yo, Konnichiwa)
 Pada Malam yang Berbadai (Arashi no Yoru ni wa)
 Candy
 Locker Room Boy
 Perbuatan Angin Malam (Yokaze no Shiwaza)
 100 Meter ke Minimarket (100 Meter Conbini)
 Suka, Suka, Suka (Suki, Suki, Suki)
 Membeku Karena Selamat Tinggal (Sayonara no Kanashibari)
 Surat Undangan Sang Angin Laut (Shiokaze no Shoutaijou)
Encore
 Honest Man
 Team J Oshi
 Pesawat Terbang Kertas Milik Kita (Bokutachi no Kamihikouki)

Bel Terakhir Berbunyi
Bel Terakhir Berbunyi, also known as Saishuu Bell ga Naru and literally translated as "The Final Bell Rings", is a theater stage performed by Team KIII from 1 August 2015 to 27 November 2016.

The set list contains sixteen performed songs, preceded by an overture recorded specifically for the group, following its sister groups.

Set list
 Overture
 Mammoth
 Bel Terakhir Berbunyi (Saishuu Bell ga Naru)
 Cara Mendapatkan Pacar (Boyfriend no Tsukurikata)
 Tak Ingin Jadi Orang Hebat (Erai Hito ni Naritakunai)
 Return Match
 Pencuri Cinta Pertama (Hatsukoi Dorobou)
 Maafkan, Permataku (Gomen Ne Jewel)
 Benang Sari, Putik, dan Kupu-Kupu Malam (Oshibe to Meshibe to Yoru no Chouchou)
 Lagu 18 Bersaudari (18nin Shimai no Uta)
 Stand Up!
 Cool Girl
 Kapasitas Ikan Migrasi (Kaiyuugyou no Capacity)
 Pergi untuk Bertemu (Ai ni Ikou)
Encore
 Kucing Siam (Shamu Neko)
 Jalan Melos (Melos no Michi)
 Dukungan (Sasae)

Team KIII B•E•L•I•E•V•E Show
Team KIII B•E•L•I•E•V•E Show was a special theater stage, performed by Team KIII to celebrate the group's 5th anniversary, from 8 December 2016 to 27 February 2018. The stage consists of previously released and unreleased performed songs.

Initially, the stage consisted of 15 songs. The later shows featured an amended set list in which the "unit songs" – the 4th until 7th song – was extended to the eight songs. The "/" below are sorted based on which song was sung first on that order. The songs in each theater show were different and thus had no songs repeated during that particular show.

Set list
 Overture
 1! 2! 3! 4! Yoroshiku!
 Musim Panas Sounds Good! (Manatsu no Sounds Good!)
 Ponytail dan Shu-shu (Ponytail to Shushu)
 Blue Rose or Bird or Return Match or Candy or Glory Days
 Cinta Pertama di Jam 7 Lewat 12 / Joan of Arc di Dalam Cermin / Benang Sari, Putik, dan Kupu-Kupu Malam / Cinta Pertamaku, Selamat Siang / Barcode Hati Ini / Jatuhkan dengan Kiss Bye!
 Sang Pianis Hujan / Ajak Aku Pergi Menuju ke Wimbledon /  Pin Heel Merah dan Profesor / Prinsip Kesucian Hati / Candy
 Bunga Matahari / Pada Malam yang Berbadai / Pelaut yang Melihat Mimpi di Tengah Badai / Rok Bergoyang / Locker Room Boy / Return Match / Dua Orang yang Terlarang 
 Malaikat Hitam / Pin Heel Merah dan Profesor / Ajak Aku Pergi Menuju ke Wimbledon / Ayo Penuh Skandal 
 Langit Biru Cinta Searah / Kali Ini Ecstasy
 Kilat yang Indah (Utsukushii Inazuma)
 Medley (River, Beginner, Escape; later Beloklah Ke Kanan!, How Come?, Don't Look Back!)
 Kembang Api Milikku (Boku no Uchiage Hanabi)
Encore
 Scrap & Build / Kamonegix 
 Selamanya Pressure (Eien Pressure)
 Team KIII Oshi
 Apakah Kau Melihat Mentari Senja? (Yuuhi wo Miteiru ka?) / Di Tempat yang Jauh pun (Tooku ni Ite mo)

Team J B•E•L•I•E•V•E Show
Team J B•E•L•I•E•V•E Show was a special theater stage, performed by Team J to celebrate the group's 5th anniversary, from 9 December 2016 to 14 May 2017. The stage consists of previously released and unreleased performed songs.

Set list
 Overture
 Flying Get
 Simpati Gravitasi (Juuryoku Sympathy)
 Cinta Tak Berbalas Finally (Kataomoi Finally)
 Maafkan Summer (Gomen ne, Summer)
 Bird
 Kaca Berbentuk I LOVE YOU (Glass no I LOVE YOU)
 Classmate
 Hubungan Antara Kau dan Aku (Kimi to Boku no Kankei)
 Lagu 22 Bersaudari (22nin Shimai no Uta)
 Nagiichi
 Ciuman Juga Kidal (Kiss Datte Hidarikiki)
 Laptime Gadis Remaja (Seishun no Laptime)
 Demi Seseorang (Dareka no Tame ni ~What can I do for someone?~)
Encore
 HA!
 Pareo adalah Emerald (Pareo wa Emerald)
 Only Today
 Pioneer

Sekarang Sedang Jatuh Cinta
Sekarang Sedang Jatuh Cinta, also known as Tadaima Renaichuu, is a program performed by Team J from 19 May 2017 to 1 March 2019.
 Overture
 Tadaima Renaichuu (Sekarang Sedang Jatuh Cinta)
 Kuma no Nuigurumi (Boneka Teddy Bear)
 Only Today
 7ji 12fun no Hatsukoi (Cinta Pertama di Jam 7 Lewat 12)
 Haru ga Kuru Made (Sampai Musim Semi Tiba)
 Junai no Crescendo (Cinta yang Tulus, Crescendo)
 Faint
 Kikyou (Pulang Kampung)
 Darui Kanji (Rasanya Malas)
 Mr. Kissman
 Kimi ga Oshiete Kureta (Kamulah yang Memberitahu Aku)
 BINGO!
 Keibetsu Shiteita Aijou (Rasa Sayang yang Dulu Aku Remehkan)
Encore
 LOVE CHASE
 Seifuku ga Jama wo Suru (Seragam Ini Sangat Mengganggu)
 Nante Suteki na Sekai ni Umareta no Darou (Betapa Indahnya Dunia Tempat Kita Lahir)

Back Hip Circle
Back Hip Circle, also known as Saka Agari, is a theater stage performed by Team KIII from 4 March 2018.
 Overture
 Tenohira (Telapak Tangan)
 Saka Agari (Back Hip Circle)
 Hitei no Requiem (Penyangkalan Diri Requiem)
 Sono Ase wa Uso wo Tsukanai (Keringat itu Tidak Berbohong)
 End Roll
 Wagamama na Nagareboshi (Si Bintang Jatuh yang Egois)
 Ai no Iro (Warna Cinta)
 Dakishimeraretara (Jika Aku Dipelukmu)
 Mushi no Ballad (Balada Serangga)
 Furishite Maneshite (Pura-pura dan Kepalsuan)
 Umi wo Watare! (Seberangi Lautan)
 Machikado no Party (Party di Sudut Jalan)
 Fan Letter
Encore
 Fugiri (Terhina)
 Hanpa na Ikemen (Ganteng tapi Nanggung)
 To Be Continued

Fajar Sang Idola
Fajar Sang Idola, also known as Idol no Yoake, is a program performed by Team J from 3 March 2019.
 Overture
 Idol no Yoake (Fajar Sang Idola)
 Minnasan mo go Issho ni (Bersama-sama Semuanya)
 Haru Ichiban ga Fuku Koro (Angin Musim Semi Pertama)
 Kobushi no Seigi (Kebenaran Tinju Ini)
 Zannen Shoujo (Gadis yang Celaka)
 Kuchi Utsushi no Chocolate (Berikan Coklat dengan Bibir)
 Kataomoi no Taikakusen (Garis Diagonal Cinta Searah)
 Tengoku Yarou (Berandalan di Surga)
 Itoshiki Natasha (Natasha yang 'Ku Cinta)
 Joshikousei wa Yamerarenai (Tak Bisa Berhenti Jadi Gadis SMA)
 Suki to Ieba Yokatta (Andai 'Ku Dapat Ungkapkan Cinta)
 Sobakasu no Kiss (Freckles' Kiss)
 Tanpopo no Kesshin (Keteguhan Hati Dandelion)
Encore
 J Stars
 Yokosuka Curve (Jalan Berkelok Yokosuka)
 Arigatou (Terima Kasih)

Tunas di Balik Seragam

Cara Meminum Ramune

Fly, Team T

Unreleased songs 
JKT48 has performed numerous songs that are yet to be released

 Kitagawa Kenji (2012)
 JKT48 (2013)
 Tenohira ga Kataru Koto (2013)
 NEW SHIP (2013)
 Aozora Kataomoi (2014)
 Skirt, Hirari (2014)
 Party ga Hajimaru yo (2014)
 Glass no I LOVE YOU (2014)
 Classmate (2014)
 Nakinagara Hohoende (2014)
 Oteage Lullaby (2014)
 Tobenai Agehachou (2015)
 Ue Kara Melody (2015)

 Scandalous ni Ikou (2015)
 Futari wa Dekiteru (2015)
 Plastic no Kuchibiru (2015)
 Oboete Kudasai (2015)
 Ougon Center (2015)
 Anata to Christmas Eve (2015)
 Akai Pin Heel to Professor (2017)
 Ai no Sonzai (2018)
 Tsuyosa to Yowasa no Aida de (2019)
 Better (2019)
 Sakura no Ki ni Narou (2020)
 Jiwaru DAYS (2021)
 Shoujo wa Manatsu ni Nani wo Suru? (2022)

 Banzai Venus (2022)
 Must Be Now (2022)
 Yume wo Shinaseru Wake ni Ikanai (2022)
 Seventeen (2022)
 Green Flash (2022)

Filmography

Films

Television shows

References 
Footnotes

Bibliography

 

News sources

 
 
 

Discography
Musical group filmographies